The Ilha do Cardoso State Park is a state park on the coast of the state of São Paulo, Brazil.
It preserves a large area of Atlantic Forest on the Ilha do Cardoso, an island, and includes marshes and mangroves that form an important breeding area for marine life.
Visitors may reach the island by boat and stay in one of the villages. They may visit the beaches or follow trails into the interior, where there are waterfalls and natural pools.

Location

The Ilha do Cardoso State Park is in the municipality of Cananéia in the extreme south of the state of São Paulo.
The state park occupies about 90% of the Ilha do Cardoso, and can be reached by boat from the town of Cananéia.
The island is bounded by the Atlantic Ocean to the east, the Bay of Trapandé to the north, the Ararapira Channel to the west and the Ararapira Bar to the south.
The Atlantic coast has beaches, dunes and rocky shores.
The park is part of the Lagamar Mosaic:

There are six communities of caiçaras in the park, with about 465 residents.
They are strongly influenced by indigenous culture, and have developed an accurate knowledge of nature.
They are mainly fishermen, and also gain significant income from tourism.
Perequê, on the north shore, is 20 minutes by launch or 50 minutes by schooner from Cananeia.
Marujá, in the south, is a fishing village with more accommodation and restaurants.
It is 55 minutes by launch or 3 hours by schooner from Cananeia.
The only electricity is provided by generators, which are turned off after 11:00pm.

History

The Ilha do Cardoso State Park  was created by state decree 40.319 of 3 July 1962.
The park is home to the Center for Applied Research in Natural Resources of the Ilha do Cardoso (CEPARNIC), at first under the Secretary of State for Agriculture
and Supply, and in the 1990s transferred the Secretary of State for the Environment.

Environment

The park is in the Atlantic Forest biome.
It has diverse vegetation including restinga, coastal forests and mangroves.
The forest covers 90% of the island.
The western side of the island has mangroves, and the coastal plain is mostly covered by restinga.
Almost 1,000 plant species have been identified.

The park lies in the Iguape-Cananéia-Paranaguá estuary lagoon complex that stretches from Peruíbe in São Paulo state to Paranaguá in Paraná.
The complex is one of the largest breeding grounds for South Atlantic marine species.
The park is home to endangered fauna such as the red-tailed amazon (Amazona brasiliensis) and the broad-snouted caiman (Caiman latirostris).
The park has many species of bromeliad, which host invertebrate and vertebrate communities, which have been studied in detail.  There are many archaeological sites holding ruins of human occupation from the colonial period, and a landmark of the Treaty of Tordesillas.

Attractions

The park has its headquarters in Perequê.
Perequê has a visitor center and a waterfront kiosk on the Praia de Itacuruçá, and several trails.
The busy fishing village of Marujá also has trails that lead to waterfalls and fountains.
Boats may be hired in either center for trips to other parts of the island and hikes on trails, where visitors must be accompanied by monitors.
The Cachoeira Grande (Great Waterfall) is reached from Marujá by a 15-minute boat ride and 20 minutes walk along a trail. 
Visitors can swim in the pool.

The beaches can be visited without a guide.
The beaches of Laje, Ipanema, Fole Grande and Fole Pequeno have natural pools for swimming.
Enseada da Baleia (Whale Cove) is a popular spot for families.
The Praia do Marujá has  of clear sand, reached by a 10-minute trail from Marujá.
The Pontal da Praia is at the north end of the island,  from Marujá. 
The Praia da Laje is a large beach, with a  trail at the end that leads to freshwater pools.
The Praia Ipanema has a natural pool for swimming.
A trail leads from the beach to the Ipanema Waterfall.

Notes

Sources

Further reading

State parks of Brazil
Protected areas of São Paulo (state)
1962 establishments in Brazil